Asia Continental Airlines (or Asia Continental Avialines) was an airline based in Almaty, Kazakhstan, operating charter flights out of Almaty International Airport. The company was founded in 1999. On 18 October 2010, it had its airline license revoked.

Fleet
Asia Continental Airlines operated the following aircraft types:

Antonov An-24
Antonov An-26
Boeing 737-800
Ilyushin Il-76
Yakovlev Yak-40

Accidents and incidents

On 14 February 2008, an Asia Continental Airlines Ilyushin Il-76 (registered UN-76020) was damaged beyond repair in an engine fire at Kandahar Airport, Afghanistan.

References

Defunct airlines of Kazakhstan
Airlines established in 1999
Airlines disestablished in 2010
1999 establishments in Kazakhstan